Ádám Fischer (born 9 September 1949 in Budapest) is a Hungarian conductor. He is the general music director of the Austro-Hungarian Haydn Orchestra, chief conductor of the Danish Chamber Orchestra, and chief conductor of the Düsseldorfer Symphoniker.

Career
Ádám Fischer is an elder brother of the conductor Iván Fischer. The two belonged to the children's choir of Budapest National Opera house, and sang as two of the three boys in Mozart's Die Zauberflöte.

Fischer studied piano and composition at the Bartók Conservatory (hu) in Budapest, and conducting with Hans Swarowsky in Vienna.  He also studied with Franco Ferrara at Accademia Chigiana in Siena. He won first prize in the Milan Guido Cantelli Competition.  His career began with opera conducting in Munich, Freiburg, and other German cities.  In 1982 he made his Paris Opéra debut, leading Der Rosenkavalier, and in 1986 he made his debut at La Scala, Milan, leading Die Zauberflöte.  Between 1987 and 1992, he was the general music director in Kassel.

Fischer began a long collaboration with the Vienna State Opera in 1973.  In January 2017, he was named an honorary member of the company.

In 1987, Fischer established the Austro-Hungarian Haydn Orchestra and started the Haydn Festival in the Austrian city of Eisenstadt. He has recorded the complete Haydn symphonies for the Nimbus label, the first digital recording of the cycle, with the orchestra.  In July 1989, Fischer started the first Gustav Mahler Festivals in Kassel. In 1998, Fischer was appointed chief conductor of the Danish National Chamber Orchestra. Fischer has recorded the complete Opere serie by Wolfgang Amadeus Mozart with this orchestra, and is currently recording Mozart's complete symphonies.

At the end of 2010 Fischer resigned as Music Director of the Hungarian State Opera in protest against the controversial media law introduced in Hungary in 2011. Speaking in Brussels on 11 January 2011 he told reporters:

 'A lot of the attention has focused on the new law but the problems run far deeper. Even more worrying are changes to the national constitution that are being drafted and the rise of anti-Semitism, homophobia and xenophobia in Hungarian society.'

Fischer joined with András Schiff, Miklós Jancsó and others in an open letter condemning the Hungarian government's record on these issues.

Fischer has recorded commercially for Nimbus, CBS, EMI, Hungaroton, Delta, Dacapo and Naxos.  In 1982, he won the Grand Prix du Disque. In 2018, he was the laureate of the Wolf Prize in Arts.

References

Sources
  Dr. Raab and Dr. Böhm Artist Management (Austria), official artist biography of Adam Fischer
 Friends of Ádám Fischer page

External links

 
 Interview with Ádám Fischer, 11 November 1981

Hungarian conductors (music)
Male conductors (music)
1949 births
Living people
Hungarian Jews
Jewish classical musicians
20th-century conductors (music)
20th-century Hungarian musicians
21st-century conductors (music)
21st-century Hungarian musicians
Musicians from Budapest
Wolf Prize in Arts laureates
20th-century Hungarian male musicians
21st-century Hungarian male musicians